Braginskaya is a rural locality (a village) in Pyatovskoye Rural Settlement, Totemsky District, Vologda Oblast, Russia. The population was 52 as of 2002.

Geography 
Braginskaya is located 4 km northwest of Totma (the district's administrative centre) by road. Galitskaya is the nearest rural locality.

References 

Rural localities in Tarnogsky District